Punishment Room is the debut album of Distorted Pony, released in 1992 through Bomp!. The CD version of the album contains the band's previous release, Work Makes Freedom. The album was recorded in early 1992 with the help of Steve Albini.

Track listing

Personnel 
Distorted Pony
Robert Hammer – guitar, vocals on "Forensic Interest"
Theodore Jackson – drums, percussion
Dora Jahr – bass guitar, vocals
London May – drums
David Uskovich – guitar, vocals
Production and additional personnel
Steve Albini – engineering
Distorted Pony – production

References

External links 
 

1992 debut albums
Bomp! Records albums
Distorted Pony albums